The 2021–22 Sacyr Liga ASOBAL, also named Liga ASOBAL for sponsorship reasons, is the 32nd season since its establishment. Spanish top tier handball league. A total of sixteen teams contested this season's league, which began on 3 September 2021 and is expected to end in May 2022.

Teams

League table

Results

Awards

Monthly awards

External links
Liga ASOBAL Official website

Liga ASOBAL seasons
Handball in Spain